Pedro Hugo Cicamois Díaz, known as Hugo Cicamois, is a Chilean former footballer who played as a defender. Besides Chile, he played in Ecuador.

Career
A defender from the Universidad Católica youth system, where he coincided with players such as Miguel Hermosilla, Luis Hernán Carvallo, among others, Cicamois played for the first team in 1966–67 winning the league title of the Chilean Primera División in 1966. He also played for Unión San Felipe in the top division.

In the Chilean second level, he played for Lota Schwager and San Antonio Unido.

Abroad, he played in Ecuador for club Luq San from Guayaquil in the 1975 season, alongside his compatriots Jorge Guzmán and Alejandro Arancibia.

As a football manager, he has coached Curicó Unido.

Personal life
His son of the same name, Hugo Cicamois Bedon, is a former footballer who played for Puerto Rico Islanders in 2006 and soccer manager who has worked for Atlanta Fire United.

References

External links
 
 
 

Date of birth missing (living people)
Living people
Footballers from Santiago
Chilean footballers
Chilean expatriate footballers
Club Deportivo Universidad Católica footballers
Lota Schwager footballers
San Antonio Unido footballers
Unión San Felipe footballers
Chilean Primera División players
Primera B de Chile players
Chilean expatriate sportspeople in Ecuador
Expatriate footballers in Ecuador
Association football defenders
Chilean football managers
Curicó Unido managers